Anna Stewart may refer to:

Anita Stewart (Anna May Stewart, 1895–1961), American actress
Anna Stewart (journalist), TV reporter for CNN
Anna Stewart, daughter of Andrew Stuart, 1st Baron Castle Stuart
Jane Stewart (executive) (Anna Jane Stewart, 1917–1990), American public relations executive
Anna Stewart (activist) (1947–1983), Australian activist
Anna Stewart (businesswoman) (1964–2017), British businesswoman

See also
Anne Stuart (disambiguation)